Manmohan Singh (born 1932) is the 13th Indian Prime Minister.

The name may also refer to one of the following people:

 Manmohan Singh (film director) (born 1932), Indian director 
 Man Mohan Singh (pilot) (1905 –1942), Indian aircraft pilot